Mokarimpur Union is a union parishad of Bheramara Upazila, in Kushtia District, Khulna Division of Bangladesh. There are 13 villages and 10 mouzas in the union.

References

External links
 

Unions of Khulna Division
Unions of Bheramara Upazila
Unions of Kushtia District